The fencing competition at the 1971 Mediterranean Games was held in İzmir, Turkey.

This was the first time a women's event was included in the program, individual foil, and the first fencing female gold medalist was Marie-Chantal Demaille of France.

Medalists

Men's events

Women's events

Medal table

References
1971 Mediterranean Games report at the International Committee of Mediterranean Games (CIJM) website
List of Olympians who won medals at the Mediterranean Games at Olympedia.org

M
Sports at the 1971 Mediterranean Games
1971